Brezje pri Poljčanah is a settlement in the hills above the left bank of the Dravinja River in the Municipality of Poljčane in northeastern Slovenia. The area is part of the traditional region of Styria. It is now included with the rest of the municipality in the Drava Statistical Region.

References

External links
Brezje pri Poljčanah on Geopedia

Populated places in the Municipality of Poljčane